Lake Abbe, also known as Lake Abhe Bad, is a salt lake, lying on the Ethiopia-Djibouti border. It is one of a chain of six connected lakes, which also includes (from north to south) lakes Gargori, Laitali, Gummare, Bario and Afambo. The lake is the ultimate destination of the  Awash River, which is at the center of the Afar Depression. Lake Abbe is considered one of the most inaccessible areas of the earth. The water itself is known for its flamingos. The scenery is unique.

Overview

Lake Abbe is the ultimate destination of the waters of the Awash River. It lies at the Afar Triple Junction, the central meeting place for the three pieces of the Earth's crust, a defining feature of the Afar Depression. Here three pieces of Earth's crust are each pulling away from that central point, though not all at the same speed.

On the northwest shore rises Mount Dama Ali (1069 m), a dormant volcano, while along the southwestern and southern shores extend vast salt flats, 10 km in width. Besides the Awash, seasonal affluents of Lake Abbe include two wadis, the Oleldere and Abuna Merekes, which enter the lake from the west and south, crossing the salt flats. By 1984, the surface area of the lake had decreased to two thirds of what it was in 1940. Lake Abbe is a hypersaline lake; water containing mineral salts flows in but there is no outflow, and pure water evaporates from the surface. It is also known as an "amplifier lake", the water level fluctuating dramatically in response to quite small changes in climate.

The Afar people have established a settlement near the lake's shore. These carbonate chimneys are formed by the mixing of lake water and a deeper geothermal fluid. Flamingos can also be found on the waters.

Gallery

Climate
The Lake Abbe's climate offers year-round sunny skies and dry air.

References

External links

  Photos of Lake Abbe
 ILEC database entry for Lake Abbe
 Recent trip to Lake Abbe with photos (English)
 Photographs of the limestone chimneys of Lake Abbe, February 2015

Afar Region
Awash River
Lakes of Djibouti
Bodies of water of Djibouti
Lakes of Ethiopia
Saline lakes of the Great Rift Valley
Djibouti–Ethiopia border
International lakes of Africa
Important Bird Areas of Ethiopia